Once Upon a Time is the seventh studio album by Scottish rock band Simple Minds, released in October 1985 by record label Virgin (A&M in the US).

Background 

The album paired the group with music producer Jimmy Iovine. He had worked with artists featuring an aggressive guitar-based sound, including singer-songwriters Bruce Springsteen and Stevie Nicks, and he brought that approach to the band. Iovine particularly pushed frontman Jim Kerr, aiming for more energetic vocals.

Although already successful in their native U.K. and various countries in Europe and Oceania, Simple Minds had also recently become popular in the U.S., mainly due to the Keith Forsey and Steve Schiff-penned "Don't You (Forget About Me)". That track appeared on The Breakfast Club soundtrack and had become a No. 1 hit there. However, the band deliberately left the track off the album due to their reluctance to record it. Still, the bombastic pop rock sound proved influential in the construction of much of Once Upon a Time, particularly the arena-friendly single "Alive and Kicking". Once Upon a Time also shared many influences with their previous studio album, Sparkle in the Rain, which explored a similar songwriting style.

Reception

Released on 21 October 1985 by record label Virgin (A&M in the US),  Once Upon a Time topped the UK charts, and peaked at No. 10 on the US charts, spending five consecutive weeks in the Top 10 of Billboard and 16 weeks in the Top 20.

Four singles were taken from the album: "Alive and Kicking" (UK No. 7, US No. 3), "All the Things She Said" (UK No. 9, US No. 28), "Sanctify Yourself" (UK No. 10, US No. 14), and "Ghost Dancing" (UK No. 13).

Music critic MacKenzie Wilson has retrospectively praised the album for AllMusic, stating that it provided listeners with a "raw energy and solid composition not entirely captured on previous albums." He also particularly lauded singles "Alive and Kicking" and "Sanctify Yourself."

Releases
Once Upon a Time was available with two covers upon its original LP release. The alternate cover uses the back image for the front and vice versa. It also moves the Simple Minds logo to the right of the cover. The two cover images fit together when placed side by side or above each other, and the release of the album in British record shops saw the two covers placed in a grid, alternating like the two colours on a chessboard. The album cover was standardised for the original CD release and this version has since been used for the various reissues of the album. A collectable picture disc LP was also produced. Housed in a luxury gatefold die-cut sleeve, the record featured the mottled gold effect of the sleeve. A unique lyrics sheet was also packaged in the gatefold. A magnetic jigsaw puzzle was also produced by Virgin Records to promote the album.

The album has been re-released in remastered form on several occasions, most recently in 2015. Virgin Records reissued the album as a remastered edition in 2002 (cardboard vinyl replica edition) and early 2003 (jewel-case). It was released on SACD in 2003. In 2005, Virgin released another reissue of the album: a DVD-Audio version (actually, the disc bears a DVD-Audio/Video logo), which is notable for being a completely remixed album. All the tracks were remixed in 5.1 surround sound, and additionally, a downmixed 2.0 stereo version was created for compatibility with non-surround DVD-Audio set-ups. The tracks on the remixed album differ in length in comparison to the original version. In most cases, they are longer than in the original mix. All the tracks on the remixed album contain material that has frequencies above the CD-Audio cut-off frequency, reaching beyond 30 kHz (a tribute to the original analogue multi-track tapes, and to the producers). In 2012, the original 8-track album was included in the box set 5 Album Set, which also included four other Simple Minds albums: Sons and Fascination, New Gold Dream (81-82-83-84), Sparkle in the Rain and Street Fighting Years. On 4 December 2015, multiple formats of the album were re-issued as Deluxe and Super Deluxe editions, including a Deluxe double CD digipack and a Super Deluxe 5 CD / 1 DVD boxset.

Track listing

Note
The 'deluxe edition' of Once Upon a Time consists of disc 1 (The Original Album) and disc 2 (B-Sides and Rarities).
The 'super deluxe edition' of Once Upon a Time consists of all 6 discs.

Personnel
Adapted from the album's liner notes.

 Simple Minds
Jim Kerr – vocals
Charlie Burchill – guitars
Michael MacNeil – piano, synthesizers
Mel Gaynor – drums, backing vocals
John Giblin – bass

Additional personnel
Robin Clark – additional vocals
Michael Been – background vocals
The Simms Brothers – background vocals
Carlos Alomar – background vocals
Sue Hadjopoulos – percussion on "All the Things She Said"

Technical
Jimmy Iovine – producer
Bob Clearmountain – producer
Moira Marquis – engineer
Mark McKenna – engineer
Martin White – assistant engineer 
Bob Ludwig – mastering
Mick Haggerty – artwork
Anton Corbijn – photography

Charts

Weekly charts

Year-end charts

Singles

Certifications

References

External links 

 

1985 albums
A&M Records albums
Albums produced by Bob Clearmountain
Albums produced by Jimmy Iovine
Simple Minds albums
Virgin Records albums